Woolly monkey sarcoma virus (WMSV), with synonym Simian sarcoma virus (often abbreviated by SSV, but this may also stand for some species called  'Sulfolobus spindle-shaped virus', that belong to different genera in family Fuselloviridae) is a species of gammaretrovirus that infects primates. First isolation was from a fibrosarcoma in a woolly monkey (genus Lagothrix). For its reproduction the virus needs a helper or associated virus which is called Simian sarcoma associated virus (SSAV).

See also
 HL23V

References

External links
 University of Massachusetts Medical School Umass Profiles: Sarcoma Virus, Woolly Monkey
 S. G. Devare, E. Premkumar Reddy, J. Doria Law, K. C. Robbins, S. A. Aaronson: Nucleotide Sequence of the Simian Sarcoma Virus Genome: Demonstration that its Acquired Cellular Sequences Encode the Transforming Gene Product p28sis, 
 E. P. Gelmannn, E. Petri, A. Cetta, F. Wong-Staal: Deletions of specific regions of the simian sarcoma-associated virus genome are found in defective viruses and in the simian sarcoma virus, in:  Europe PMC: J Virol. 1982 February; 41(2): 593–604 , 
 M. Born, K. on der Helm, F. Deinhardt: Virus-specific phosphoproteins in simian sarcoma virus-transformed primate cells, in: EMBO J. 1982; 1(9): 1029–1033 
 A. Johnsson, C. Betsholtz, C. H. Heldin, and B. Westermark: The phenotypic characteristics of simian sarcoma virus-transformed human fibroblasts suggest that the v-sis gene product acts solely as a PDGF receptor agonist in cell transformation, in: EMBO J. 1986 Jul; 5(7): 1535–1541 
 H. M. Fidanián, W. N. Drohán, M. A. Baluda: RNA of simian sarcoma-associated virus type 1 produced in human tumor cells, in: J Virol. 1975 Mar; 15(3): 449–457 
 L. G. Wolfe, R. K. Smith, F. Deinhardt: Simian Sarcoma Virus, Type 1 (Lagothrix): Focus Assay and Demonstration of Nontransforming Associated Virus, in: JNCI J Natl Cancer Inst (1972)   48  (6):  1905–1908, 

Gammaretroviruses